The Cove Creek Bridge is a historic bridge, carrying Arkansas Highway 309 across Cove Creek, south of the hamlet of Corley, Arkansas in the Ozark-St. Francis National Forest. It is built entirely out of stone, with a concrete and asphalt deck, and concrete barriers at the sides. It was built in 1936 with funding support from the Works Progress Administration.

The bridge was listed on the National Register of Historic Places in 1995.

See also
Cove Creek Bridge (Martinville, Arkansas)
Cove Creek Tributary Bridge
Cove Lake Spillway Dam-Bridge
List of bridges documented by the Historic American Engineering Record in Arkansas
List of bridges on the National Register of Historic Places in Arkansas
National Register of Historic Places listings in Logan County, Arkansas

References

External links

Historic American Engineering Record in Arkansas
Road bridges on the National Register of Historic Places in Arkansas
Bridges completed in 1936
Transportation in Logan County, Arkansas
National Register of Historic Places in Logan County, Arkansas
Stone arch bridges in the United States
1936 establishments in Arkansas
Works Progress Administration in Arkansas
Ozark–St. Francis National Forest